Ragini MMS is an Indian erotic-horror franchise of films and Web series created by Balaji Motion Pictures and ALT Entertainment. There is two films of this series released in 2011 and 2014 respectively, and a web series is currently premiering on ALT Balaji from 19 October 2017. Along with the second season of the web series which is Set to Premier on 18 December 2019 on ALT Balaji App & Zee5 App.

Overview

Ragini MMS

A young woman goes out on a weekend trip to a deserted farmhouse with her scheming lover. However, the couple soon witnesses a series of paranormal events.

Ragini MMS 2

A director attempts to shoot an erotic horror movie in a house where, unbeknown to him, a demonic spirit resides. Even before the crew starts filming, the spirit possesses the lead actress's body.

Films

Webseries

Overview

Ragini MMS: Returns is an Indian erotic horror web series produced under ALTBalaji. The series is the third installment in this franchise. The first season starred Karishma Sharma, Riya Sen and Siddharth Gupta. It premiered on ALTBalaji and ZEE5 on 19 October 2017. The second season stars Sunny Leone, Divya Agarwal, Varun Sood in the leading roles. The show released on 18 December 2019. It is directed by Suyash Vadhavkar, Shahriyar Afsan Ovro and produced by Ekta Kapoor and Shobha Kapoor.

Cast and characters

Crew

Release and revenue

Awards

Ragini MMS (2011)
Best Searchlight Film – Ekta Kapoor

References

External links
 
 

 
 

2010s horror thriller films
2014 horror films
Indian ghost films
Indian haunted house films
2010s Hindi-language films
Indian horror thriller films
Indian erotic thriller films
Indian sequel films
Thriller film series
Horror film franchises